Rovieng District is a district located in Preah Vihear Province, in northern Cambodia. According to the 1998 census of Cambodia, it had a population of 26,552.

Administration 
The following table shows the villages of Rovieng district by commune.

References

Districts of Preah Vihear province